Naval Station Great Lakes (NAVSTA Great Lakes) is the home of the United States Navy's only current boot camp, located near North Chicago, in Lake County, Illinois. Important tenant commands include the Recruit Training Command, Training Support Center and Navy Recruiting District Chicago. Naval Station Great Lakes is the largest military installation in Illinois and the largest training station in the Navy. Within the naval service, it has several different nicknames, including "The Quarterdeck of the Navy", or the more derogatory "Great Mistakes". It is also referred to as "second boot camp" while at Training Support Command.

The original 39 buildings built between 1905 and 1911 were designed by Jarvis Hunt.

The base functions similarly to a small city, with its own fire department, Naval Security Forces (Police), and public works department.

One of the landmarks of the area is Building 1, also known as the clocktower building. Completed in 1911, the building is made of red brick, and has a tower over the third floor of the building. The large parade ground in front of the administration building is named Ross Field.

Major tenant commands

Recruit Training Command

In 1996, RTC Great Lakes became the Navy's only basic training facility. The Base Realignment and Closure Commission of 1993 resulted in the closure of Naval Training Center San Diego, California and Naval Training Center Orlando, Florida, their associated Recruit Training Commands, and the consolidation of US Navy enlisted recruit training to Great Lakes. Approximately 40,000 recruits pass through Recruit Training Command annually with an estimated 7,000 recruits on board the installation at any time. RTC Great Lakes has been active for over 100 years.

Training Support Center
TSC Great Lakes is the Navy's premier technical training command. It has an annual throughput of 16,000 Sailors a year. TSC supports the following six learning sites:

Surface Combat Systems Training Command (SCSTC)
Surface Warfare Officers School Command Unit (SWOSU)
Center for EOD and Dive (CNEODD)
Center for Naval Leadership (CNL)
Center for Personal Development (CPD)
Center for Service Support (CSS)

The following rating training class A-schools are located at Naval Station Great Lakes:

Electrician's Mate (EM)
Electronics Technician (ET)
Fire Controlman (FC)
Gunner's Mate (GM)
Interior Communications Electrician (IC)
Boatswain's Mate (BM)
Operations Specialist (OS)
Hull Maintenance Technician (HT)
Damage Controlman (DC)
Engineman (EN)
Gas Turbine System Technician (Electrical) (GSE)
Gas Turbine System Technician (Mechanical) (GSM)
Machinery Repairman (MR)
Quartermaster (QM)
Machinist Mate (MM)

Culinary Specialist (CS) A-school was also taught at TSC Great Lakes until December 10, 2010, when the school graduated its final class. The course has been consolidated with the US Army's parallel program and relocated to Fort Lee, Virginia.

Hospital Corpsman (HM) "A" School has been moved out of Great Lakes. The last class graduated on July 27, 2011. Its last class was Class 11–125. The school has relocated to the Medical Education and Training Campus at Fort Sam Houston, Joint Base San Antonio, Texas. This change has merged Air Force, Army, and Navy Medical staff to a centralized location.

In addition, all Navy rates that require basic electrical knowledge and troubleshooting training complete Apprentice Technical Training (ATT) school. This includes the Mineman (MN) and Sonar Technician (Surface) (STG) rates, as well as some aviation rates prior to detachment to their respective school locations in San Diego, CA and Pensacola, Florida. Boatswain's Mates complete Surface Common Core (SCC) Basic Maintenance Training and engineering rates complete Basic Engineering Common Core (BECC)

History
Great Lakes was approved in 1904 by Theodore Roosevelt. Construction was supervised by Navy Captain Albert R. Ross. Chicago-area architect Jarvis Hunt designed the original 39 buildings and Lt. George A. McKay was the civil engineer for the construction on the  wilderness location; $3.5 million ‎($ today) was appropriated to finance construction. President William Howard Taft dedicated the Naval Training Station in 1911. On 3 July 1911, Joseph Gregg was the first recruit to arrive. He would graduate in the first class of 300. Fifty-five years later, he was buried at the Naval Station Cemetery 5 July 1966.

Legendary band leader and march composer John Philip Sousa was commissioned as a lieutenant in the Navy during World War I. He led the Great Lakes Naval Station Band from mid-1917 until shortly after the Armistice was implemented in November 1918. Great Lakes also had a Radio School including two  towers constructed in 1915. From 1911 to 1916 around 2,000 recruits a year were trained at Great Lakes.

World War I

Interwar period
In 1923, Naval Reserve Air Base, Great Lakes was commissioned. Recruit training slowed after the war and halted in 1933. A port was constructed around that time at a cost of $1 million ($ today).

On 1 July 1933, Great Lakes was closed and placed in a maintenance status. It was reopened 1 July 1935 after lobbying by local businessmen and the Congressional Delegation from Illinois. In 1936, aviation training was moved from Great Lakes to Naval Air Station Glenview.

On 9 December 1940, the Class A Service School opened for its first class.

World War II

On 7 December 1941, Pearl Harbor was attacked by Japan, and around 6,000 sailors were training at Great Lakes. This grew to 68,000 in six months; by September 1942, over 100,000 Sailors were training at Great Lakes. By mid-1943, there were over 700 instructors at the Class A service schools.

The Navy selected Great Lakes to be the site of the first African American trainees. On 5 June 1942, Doreston Luke Carmen of Galveston, Texas was the first recruit to enter the segregated training facility at Camp Robert Smalls. In September 1942, segregated "Negro Service Schools" were opened. The policy of segregation led to small service school classes with only four or five students in a class. By 1944 Great Lakes began to integrate training and all training was integrated by mid-1945. The Golden Thirteen were commissioned in March 1944 after training at Great Lakes.

Four million served on active duty in the Navy during World War II. Over one million Sailors were trained at Great Lakes.

1946 to 1960

In 1948, a boot camp for WAVES (female recruits) opened at Great Lakes, first graduating 5 October 1948. In 1951, female recruit training left Great Lakes for United States Naval Training Center Bainbridge, Maryland.

Great Lakes hosted the Commander, Ninth Naval District from 1945 until the District was disestablished on 30 June 1979.

In March 1954, new facilities at Great Lakes for training Gunner's Mates, Fire Controlmen, Opticalmen, and Instrumentmen were dedicated, at a cost of $2.2 million ($ today). At the time, the  Gunnery School was said to have the largest all-glass facade in the world. Designed by Bruce Graham (co-designer of the former Sears Tower and John Hancock Center) of the Chicago office of Skidmore, Owings & Merrill, the Gunnery School was demolished in 2012 after hands-on training transitioned to computer-based training in 2005. In 2008, an attempt was made to preserve the structure, which was described as a "Cathedral of the Cold War".

Starting in the late 1950s, new barracks, mess halls, classrooms, and staff offices at the Recruit Training Center were built for around $8 million. These facilities served the Navy until the late 1990s rebuild of the recruit training facility.

1960s and 1970s

On 9 December 1960, Great Lakes Naval Hospital (building 200H) was dedicated replacing the original hospital, building 1H. Demolition of the hospital began in January 2013 after its services were transitioned to the Captain James A. Lovell Federal Health Care Center in 2010.

In August 1965, facilities at Great Lakes were used as a morgue in the aftermath of the crash of United Airlines Flight 389.

In the early morning hours of 11 March 1967, Rear Admiral Howard A. Yeager, Commander, 9th Naval District, was killed by a fire at his quarters at Great Lakes. Admiral Yeager and two hospital corpsman (WAVES) died attempting to save the Admiral's wife, who was under medical care for multiple sclerosis. She also died several days later.

On 28 September 1972, 18 were injured at Great Lakes when a tornado struck two of the base housing areas.

1979 riots
In 1979, there was violence between sailors at Great Lakes and civilians of North Chicago. In June 1979, more than 300 sailors armed with bricks and rocks rioted in North Chicago for at least two consecutive nights in protest after a group of civilians infiltrated the base and beat a sailor. Two hundred sailors were said to have climbed the fence, entering North Chicago and clashing with local police. Sixteen persons were arrested, with five injuries on the first night. Five were arrested by police, with 16 in custody of Navy authorities on the second night. Additionally, six sailors and five police officers were injured on the second night of riots and a police cruiser was overturned. Sailors claimed unfair treatment and harassment in the North Chicago entertainment district known as the "strip". Local officials disputed the claims. The six-block entertainment district or "strip" was eventually placed off limits indefinitely by the base commander.

In the aftermath of the rioting, 58 summary courts-martial were conducted, 19 sailors were found not guilty, and the base commander Captain Robert D. Colvin was replaced by Rear Admiral Thomas L. Malone Jr.

Days after the riots on 28 June 1979, four were sought in connection with the robbery of the Great Lakes Naval Station branch of the Citizens Bank of Waukegan. Around $125,000 ($ today) was stolen. The bank manager was abducted from his home in Zion and was held captive along with several others until the automatic lock of the bank vault allowed it to be opened the next morning. No one was harmed in the robbery. Payday for the base was set for the following day.

1980s
In 1984, 34 people were arrested in a drug sting called Operation Blueboy, in which investigators posed as sailors based at Great Lakes. Nineteen of those arrested were cab drivers, while others were tavern employees on the North Chicago "strip".

The site was added to the National Register of Historic Places as Great Lakes Naval Training Station historic district in 1986 covering , 43 buildings, 14 structures, and six objects.

In September 1986, a US naturalized immigrant from Pakistan shot three, killing a senior instructor, after it became clear that he would be dropped from an electronics training program at Apprentice Technical Training in Great Lakes. He was sentenced to life in prison and a dishonorable discharge in 1987.

1990s
The North Chicago "strip" was well known for prostitution, drugs, and crime by the early 1990s, when it became further isolated from the base after King Drive railroad crossing was closed, cutting the city's connection to Great Lakes. Following the September 11 attacks in 2001, food deliveries from off base were further restricted, continuing the area's economic decline.

Base Realignment and Closure of 1993

The 1993 Base Realignment and Closure Commission recommended the closure of recruit training in San Diego and Orlando, making Great Lakes the sole US Navy site for recruit training. The recommendations were predicted to result in a net gain of over 8,000 military and civilian jobs to Great Lakes.

Base Realignment and Closure of 2005

The 2005 Base Realignment and Closure Commission recommended a realignment of Great Lakes that would result in the loss of around 2,000 jobs. At the time, Illinois Governor Rod Blagojevich pledged to retain as many of the jobs as possible. The Naval Station Great Lakes and the Recruit Training / Boot Camp portion were not slated for closing. Almost $800 million had been invested in building new barracks ("ships"), Battle Stations 21, as well as numerous upgrades around the base, including a non-denominational chapel, and reception center for civilian families. It is the United States Navy's only boot camp facility. Approximately 40,000 recruits pass through RTC annually with up to 7,000 enrolled at the installation at any time.

Geographically, the station separates the affluent North Shore from the more industrial Waukegan/North Chicago area, the latter now announcing numerous redevelopments across their span for strip malls and New Urban residency communities.

Athletics

The Great Lakes Bluejackets played intercollegiate football from the 1910s to the 1940s including a victory in the 1919 Rose Bowl and a 1943 victory over the undefeated Notre Dame Fighting Irish football squad. Some of the football greats that played for Great Lakes included George Halas, Johnny Lujack and Otto Graham. Notably, Paul Brown, Weeb Ewbank and Frank Leahy were coaches for Great Lakes football as well. In 2010, Northwestern Wildcats football announced they were exploring the possibility of holding practice at Great Lakes.

Great Lakes baseball teams had a record of 188 wins and 32 losses during World War II. In one of the more famous games, in July 1945, Chief Petty Officer Bob Feller pitched a shutout with 10 strikeouts against the Chicago Cubs.

Museum

The National Museum of the American Sailor is one of the museums operated by the Naval History & Heritage Command. As an official Department of the Navy Museum, the National Museum of the American Sailor's mission is to select, collect, preserve, and interpret the history of the United States Navy with particular emphasis on the Navy's enlisted Sailor.

See also
United States Naval Training Center Bainbridge

References

Further reading

External links

Naval Station Great Lakes official website
Navy Lodge Great Lakes
Navy.com – Boot Training

Great Lakes Navy Boot Camp Yearbooks

Great Lakes
1911 establishments in Illinois
Military installations in Illinois
Military facilities on the National Register of Historic Places in Illinois
National Register of Historic Places in Lake County, Illinois
North Chicago, Illinois
Populated places established in 1911
Historic districts on the National Register of Historic Places in Illinois
Lake Michigan
Military installations established in 1911